The governor of Ifugao, is the chief executive of the provincial government of Ifugao.

Lieutenant Governors and Deputy Governors of the Sub-province of Ifugao (1901-1966)

Provincial Governors (1966-2025)

There have been thirteen (13) provincial governors of Ifugao since its creation in 1966.

References

Governors of Ifugao
Ifugao
1966 establishments in the Philippines